Oskar Frenzel (12 November 1855 – 15 May 1915) was a German landscape-artist, animal painter and lithographer.

Life
Frenzel was originally a lithographer.  He became an animal and landscape painter in addition to his work as a lithographer from 1879 in the evening classes of the teaching institute of Museum of Decorative Arts Berlin.  Between 1884 and 1889 he studied at the Prussian Academy of Arts in Berlin under Paul Friedrich Meyerheim and Eugen Bracht.  With his colleague Paul Müller-Kaempff in 1889 he "discovered" the fishing village of Ahrenshoop on the Baltic Sea, where an artists' colony emerged in the following years.

He won first prizes at exhibitions in Berlin, such as in 1896 a large gold medal at the International Art Exhibition, Frenzel in 1898 co-founded the Berlin Secession and was a member of its committee. In 1902 he joined the Secession again and was from 1904 until his death a member of the Prussian Academy of Arts.  His works were in the Alte Nationalgalerie (Old National Gallery) in Berlin, the Neue Pinakothek (New Pinakothek) in Munich and in the museums of Dresden, Königsberg, Magdeburg and Vienna.

Further reading

References

External links

 Oskar Frenzel webpage by Alfried Nehring
 Paintings from Oskar Frenzel at Artnet

Artists from Berlin
Prussian Academy of Arts alumni
19th-century German painters
19th-century German male artists
German male painters
20th-century German painters
20th-century German male artists
1855 births
1915 deaths
German landscape painters
German lithographers
20th-century German printmakers
20th-century lithographers